Dara, Afghanistan is a village in Afghanistan, located in the mountains nearly midway between  Herat and Kabul at 34° 16'N and 66°16 E
Its mountainous location causes temperature variations from -20°c to 11 °C. most precipitation occurs in the Winter.
The population is predominantly Hazara.

See also 
 Shakar Dara
 Momand Dara
 Anar Dara District
 Alim Dara

References 

Villages in Afghanistan